Mount Hahn is a mountain, about  high, situated between Walter Glacier and Hampton Glacier at the head of Schokalsky Bay, in northeastern Alexander Island, Antarctica. It was photographed from the air by the Ronne Antarctic Research Expedition, 1947–48, and surveyed by the Falkland Islands Dependencies Survey, 1948–50. It was named by the Advisory Committee on Antarctic Names for Lieutenant Commander Gerald L. Hahn, a U.S. Navy LC-130 aircraft pilot during Operation Deep Freeze, 1975 and 1976.

See also
 Mount Athelstan
 Mount Bayonne
 Mount Cupola

References

Mountains of Alexander Island